Rear Admiral Puneet Chadha, VSM is a serving flag officer of the Indian Navy. He currently serves as the Additional Director General of the National Cadet Corps. He previously served as the Flag Officer Tamil Nadu & Puducherry Naval Area (FOTNA) and as the Deputy Commandant of the Indian Naval Academy. As the last commanding officer of the aircraft carrier , he decommissioned the carrier in 2017.

Naval career 
Chadha graduated from the National Defence Academy and was commissioned into the Indian Navy on 1 July 1987. He specialised in anti-submarine warfare (ASW). He attended the Malaysian Armed Forces Staff College, Kuala Lumpur. He has also attended the Higher Naval Command course at the Naval War College, Goa and the National Defence College. In his instructional appointments, Chadha has served as Directing Staff at Centre for Leadership and Behavioral Studies (CLABS) in Kochi and at the Defence Services Staff College, Wellington.

Chadha has commanded the Veer-class corvette  and the Submarine rescue vessel . He subsequently commanded the lead ship of her class of guided-missile destroyers . In 2016, he took over as commanding officer of the aircraft carrier . He was in command of INS Viraat during the International Fleet Review 2016 (IFR 2016) at Visakhapatnam. IFR 2016 was the last action seen by Viraat as she was decommissioned soon after. As the 22nd and last CO of Viraat, Chadha decommissioned the aircraft carrier in a ceremony in Mumbai.

Chadha has served as the Fleet Operations Officer of the Eastern Fleet, based in Visakhapatnam. He has served as Director in the Perspective Planning directorate at the Army headquarters and as Director Net assessment in the Integrated Defence Staff headquarters. At Naval HQ, he has served as the Director and Principal Director Staff Requirements.

Flag rank
On 27 March 2018, Chadha was promoted to the rank of Rear admiral and appointed Deputy Commandant and Chief Instructor of the Indian Naval Academy, Ezhimala. After a year-long stint, he moved to Visakhapatnam as the Chief Staff Officer (Operations) of the Eastern Naval Command. As CSO (Ops), he led a delegation to China, participating in the PLA Navy International Fleet Review in April 2019. On 30 April 2022, he was appointed Flag Officer Commanding Tamil Nadu & Puducherry Naval Area (FOTNA).

Awards and decorations

References 

Indian Navy admirals
National Defence Academy (India) alumni
National Defence College, India alumni
Living people
Year of birth missing (living people)
Recipients of the Vishisht Seva Medal
Naval War College, Goa alumni